Tina Snow is the second extended play by American rapper Megan Thee Stallion. It was released on June 8, 2018, by 1501 Certified Entertainment and 300 Entertainment. It features the single "Big Ole Freak", her first entry on the US Billboard Hot 100. The alter ego "Tina Snow" was inspired by Pimp C's alter ego "Tony Snow".

Track listing

Charts

References

2018 EPs
Megan Thee Stallion EPs